Short loin is the American name for a cut of beef that comes from the back of the cattle. It contains part of the spine and includes the top loin and the tenderloin.  This cut yields types of steak including porterhouse, strip steak (Kansas City Strip, New York Strip), and T-bone (a cut also containing partial meat from the tenderloin). The T-bone is a cut that contains less of the tenderloin than does the porterhouse. Webster's Dictionary defines it as "a portion of the hindquarter of beef immediately behind the ribs that is usually cut into steaks." The short loin is considered a tender beef.

In Australian, British and South African butchery, this cut is referred to as the sirloin (sometimes as the striploin in South Africa).

See also

References

Cuts of beef